The Ukrainian Radio Symphony Orchestra (previously NRCU Symphony Orchestra) is the broadcasting orchestra of the Ukrainian Radio since 1929. Now the orchestra is a part of the national public broadcaster UA:PBC.

The rehearsal base and the main concert venue of the orchestra is the Recording House of Ukrainian Radio, located in Kyiv.

History 
The newly created orchestra of Ukrainian Radio-Center at that time, first performed in public October 5, 1929, which was followed by critical acclaim and to date is considered an important moment of Ukrainian cultural history. The best musicians of Ukraine's former capital city Kharkiv were invited to join the orchestra conducted by Yakiv Rozenshteyn. The orchestra of 45 musicians was part of the radio theatre. Its first symphonic cycle featuring works by Pyotr Ilyich Tchaikovsky started soon after opening October 14 with his 5th symphony and 3rd orchestral suite.

Due to political shifts and intern transitions the orchestra eventually moved to Ukraine's new capital Kiev and increased its number to 60 musicians. Soon becoming the only government supported symphony orchestra exclusively devoted to symphony music the orchestra continued in broadcasting, public concerts and recording for Ukraine and worldwide music labels. Especially its video-recordings proved to be highly commercially successful as the concerts being regarded national cultural highlights and added to the funds of Ukrainian Radio.

The orchestras achievements in preserving the musical tradition of Ukraine in particular and Eastern Europe in general, producing over 10.000 recordings of orchestral works have been met by getting awarded the title of Honored Collective and granted academic status for special merits in the development of musical art in Ukraine.

Throughout the years the orchestra collaborated with world famous conductors such as Mykola Kolessa, Natan Rakhlin, Theodore Kuchar, Aram Gharabekian and several others – as well as toured all across Europe and Asia including Germany, Italy, France, Spain, Poland, South Korea, Iran and Algeria.

Former conductors 
 Yakiv Rozenshteyn
 Herman Adler
 Mykhailo Kanershteyn
 Petro Polyakov 
 Kostyantyn Simeonov
 Vadym Gnedash
 Volodymyr Sirenko 
 Viatcheslav Blinov 
 Volodymyr Sheiko (since 2005)

References

External links 
 Homepage of Ukrainian Radio Symphony Orchestra on the website of Ukrainian Radio
 Orchestra line-up

Ukrainian orchestras
Radio and television orchestras
Musical groups established in 1929
Recipients of the Honorary Diploma of the Cabinet of Ministers of Ukraine